Carlos Dotor González (born 15 March 2001) is a Spanish professional footballer who plays as a midfielder and captains Real Madrid Castilla.

Career

Dotor started his career with the academy of Spanish side Rayo Majadahonda before joining La Fábrica at Real Madrid in 2015.

Career statistics

Club

Honours 

 Real Madrid Juvenil A

 UEFA Youth League: 2019–20

References

External links
 Real Madrid profile
 
 
 

2001 births
Association football midfielders
Footballers from Madrid
Living people
Primera Federación players
Real Madrid Castilla footballers
Spanish footballers
Segunda División B players